The CMC Cup is a Go competition sponsored by CMC Magnetics of Taiwan and JPMorgan Chase. Its finals consist of only one game, unlike other competitions that have a best-of-three format. The winner's purse is 2,000,000 TD ($62,700).

Winners & runners-up

International Go competitions